Drosera roraimae is a sundew native to Brazil, Guyana, and Venezuela. It was originally described as a variety of Drosera montana before being raised to species rank in 1957.

The specific epithet roraimae refers to Mount Roraima, a tepui or table-top mountain, where the type specimen was collected.

See also
List of Drosera species
Taxonomy of Drosera

References

External links

roraimae
Carnivorous plants of South America
Flora of Brazil
Flora of Guyana
Flora of Venezuela
Guayana Highlands
Plants described in 1906
Flora of the Tepuis